Cai Hesen (March 30, 1895 – August 4, 1931) was an early leader of the Chinese Communist Party (CCP), and a friend and comrade of Mao Zedong.  Cai was born in Shanghai but grew up in Shuangfeng County in Hunan Province of China. He helped Mao organize the Changsha New People's Study Society. In 1919 he went to France on the Work-Study program, and his letters of advocacy were important in convincing Mao of the Bolshevik revolutionary approach. On his return to China, he was an important leader and organizer for the young Communist Party, spent several years in Moscow, and returned to China again in 1931. While organizing revolutionary activity in Hong Kong, he was arrested and given over to Canton authorities, who executed him in August, 1931.

Youth and education
Cai's family included both merchants and scholar-officials, but his father had not done well in the family business and instead obtained a job in the Jiangnan Arsenal in Shanghai, where Cai was born, March 30, 1895, the fifth of six children. Cai's mother, left her husband, apparently angered at his taking a "secondary wife." She returned to Hunan in the spring of 1899, taking Cai and his younger sister, Cai Chang, and refusing to live with her husband even when he too returned. The family had little money but Cai found his apprenticeship in his father's business to be unbearable. Cai's mother sold her personal possessions to enable Cai to attend a village school at the age of sixteen. He then studied at Hunan First Normal School and at the Hunan First Normal University in Changsha. Cai studied under Yang Changji, and joined student movements with his fellow student Mao Zedong. In June 1917, he graduated.

In April 1918, Cai, Mao Zedong, and a dozen others organized the New People's Study Society (Xin Min Xue Hui) in Changsha. It was said that "Hesen is the theorist and Mao the realist" Yang Changji had urged his students to stay away from holding public office and to serve society by maintaining independence and moral purity. Cai rejected this Neo-Confucian position. He declared that "what I advocate is to commit wrongs in order to achieve a greater good." When he heard that the anarchists and educators Cai Yuanpei and Li Shizeng had organized a Work-Study Program to send students to France who would finance their study by working in French factories, he and other members of the Society went to Beijing to seek their help.

In France
In 1919, he traveled to France for the Work-Study Program with his mother and his sister Cai Chang. On the ship he met and fell in love with Xiang Jingyu. At a time when "free love," that is, individual choice, was considered indecent, the two discussed political problems and theories, leading to a romantic relationship. In Paris, Cai organized the Work and Study Cooperative Society (Gongxue huzhu she) and advocated Marxist communism. In May 1920, Cai and Xiang Jingyu were married. Cai's conviction that only violent revolution could solve China's problems fractured the Work-Study student group, but Cai was determined to form a Marxist party among his Hunan fellow students. Cai's letters to Mao Zedong, who was then in Beijing, were influential in their advocacy of Bolshevism.  Mao replied, "there is not one word with which I do not agree." 

In July 1920, Cai and leaders of the New People's Study Society publicly attacked the leaders of the Work-Study Movement for their optimistic anarchist belief in cultural change, education, and communal values. After the Chinese Communist Party was founded, Cai wrote and gained permission to establish an official branch in Europe. In the latter half of 1921, Cai was arrested by the French government for organizing a wave of protests against the Work-Study leadership over admissions to the Sino-French Institute at the University of Lyons, and was deported soon after.

Revolutionary career
Cai and Xiang Jingyu returned to China to work in the Chinese Communist Party's central organization. He founded the first newspaper, The Guide, of the CCP's central authority. Cai was a member of the 2nd, 3rd, 4th, 5th, and 6th Central Committees of the Chinese Communist Party, as well as a member of the 5th and 6th Central Political Bureaus and other important positions. In 1925, he served as the CCP's representative to the international Communist movement in Moscow. While in Moscow, his marriage with Xiang broke up. (In 1928 she was betrayed to the police of the French concession in Wuhan and executed.) In 1927, Cai returned to China, but went to Moscow again in 1928 to cure disease.

Death
In 1931 Cai returned to Shanghai to support the Guangdong provincial People's Committee. He then went to Hong Kong to direct party work there. He was betrayed by Gu Shunzhang when attending a meeting in Hong Kong. He was arrested in British Hong Kong and extradited to the Chinese authorities in Guangzhou, which was controlled by the warlord Chen Jitang. He was tortured and executed in August 1931, aged 36. The ex-wife of Cai, Xiang Jingyu, was arrested a few years earlier in the Shanghai French Concession in Wuhan on 20 March 1928 due to the betrayal of members of her group to the police. The French officials turned her over to the Guomindang in April 1928. On the first of May of the same year, Xiang Jingyu was executed by Guomindang police.

Family
Cai Hesen's father was Cai Rongfeng, and his mother was Ge Jianhao. His first wife was Xiang Jingyu, second wife was Li Yichun. His younger sister Cai Chang was the wife of Li Fuchun.

Cai had four children: Cai Ni and Cai Bo by Xiang Jingyu, and Cai Zhuan and Cai Lin by Li Yichun.

See also
 Historical Museum of French-Chinese Friendship

Notes

References and further reading
 
 

External links
 CHINE-MONTARGIS Amitie Chine-Montargis.

1895 births
1931 deaths
Chinese Communist Party politicians from Shanghai]
Chinese expatriates in France
Delegates to the 2nd National Congress of the Chinese Communist Party
Delegates to the 3rd National Congress of the Chinese Communist Party
Delegates to the 4th National Congress of the Chinese Communist Party
Delegates to the 5th National Congress of the Chinese Communist Party
Executed communists
Executed revolutionaries
Heads of the Publicity Department of the Chinese Communist Party
Hunan First Normal University alumni
Members of the 2nd Central Executive Committee of the Chinese Communist Party
Members of the 4th Central Executive Committee of the Chinese Communist Party
Members of the 6th Central Committee of the Chinese Communist Party
Members of the Politburo Standing Committee of the Chinese Communist Party
People executed by the Republic of China by firearm
Republic of China politicians from Shanghai